Chuqi Warmi (Aymara chuqi gold, warmi woman, Quechua chuqi precious metal, warmi woman, "gold (or metal) woman", Hispanicized spelling Choquehuarmi) or Chuki Warmi (Quechua chuki hard; sword; spear, lance, "hard (sword, spear or lance) woman") is a  mountain in the Andes of southern Peru. It is situated in the Huancavelica Region, Castrovirreyna Province, on the border of the districts of Castrovirreyna and Santa Ana, and in the Huaytará Province, Pilpichaca District. Chuqi Warmi lies south of the lake Urququcha, between Yuraq Pata in the northeast and Yana Ranra in the southwest.

References

Mountains of Huancavelica Region
Mountains of Peru